Final Conflict is an American hardcore punk band from Long Beach, California, United States, formed in 1983. They have gone through various lineup changes with the only constant member being original guitar player (and founder) Jeff Harp.

Final Conflict is regarded as one of the first extreme hardcore punk bands from Southern California. They incorporated a British-style hardcore punk rock at a time when the punk rock scene was at its weakest popularity. Their perseverance and dedicated fan base helped spark a Los Angeles and Orange County punk rock revival of sorts during the late 1980s and early 1990s. Final Conflict have stayed active and relevant through the years touring and releasing new material. In 2013 Final Conflict reunited 3/4 of the "Ashes to Ashes" lineup for the Chaos in Tejas Festival in Austin TX and Maryland Death Fest in Baltimore 2014.

Currently the band's lineup includes 1/2 of the original 1987 "Ashes to Ashes" lineup. Ron Martinez (vocals), Jeff Harp (guitar), Anthony Robles (bass) and Nick Manning (drums) and have consistently played with this lineup since 2016.

Discography

Albums
Ashes To Ashes - LP (1988) 	
Discharged-From Home Front to War Front - EP Compilation (1991)
The American Scream - EP 7" (1992)
V/A Strange Notes - A Germs Cover Compilation - CD (1996)
Face Extinction - EP 7" (1997)
INSTITUTION - E.P. 7” (1997)
Split with "No Reason" - EP Split 7" (1997)
Rebirth - LP (1997) 	
Final Conflict - EP 7" (1997)
No Peace On Earth, No Rest In Hell - LP (2006)
V/A What Are We Fighting For? - A Dead Kennedys Tribute Album - CD (2007)
"Nineteen Eighty-Five Demo" - LP (2013)
"Ashes to Ashes" - LP + 2xCD (includes 1985 demo) reissue (2014)

References

External links
Final Conflict official Facebook profile

Hardcore punk groups from California
Musical groups from Los Angeles